Mahshid (mahsheed, mah [moon] + sheed [light]; "moon light") is a Persian given name for females. Mahshid also translates moon and sun "mah" + "khorsheed"People named Mahshid include:
 Mahshid Amirshahi, Iranian writer
 Mahshid Moshiri, Iranian novelist

Persian feminine given names
Persian words and phrases